Argentina will compete at the 2022 World Athletics Championships in Eugene, United States, from 15 to 24 July 2022. Argentina has entered 11 athletes.

Entrants
 including alternates

Men

Track and road events

Field events

Women

Track and road events

References

World Championships in Athletics
2022
Nations at the 2022 World Athletics Championships